Bridekirk is a civil parish in the borough of Allerdale in Cumbria, England.  It contains 29 listed buildings that are recorded in the National Heritage List for England.  All the listed buildings are designated at Grade II, the lowest of the three grades, which is applied to "buildings of national importance and special interest".  The parish contains the villages of Bridekirk, Dovenby and Tallentire.  Most of the listed buildings are houses and associated structures, or farmhouses and farm buildings, in or near these villages.  The other listed buildings include two cross bases, a church, the ruins of its predecessor and tombs in the churchyard, a public house, a former timber saw mill and associated buildings, three milestones, and a monument.


Buildings

References

Citations

Sources

Lists of listed buildings in Cumbria